Yash Raj Films (YRF) is an Indian film production and distribution company founded by veteran filmmaker Yash Chopra in 1970 and being handled and led by his son Aditya Chopra. It mainly produces and distributes Hindi and Punjabi films. The company has grown to be one of the largest film studios in India.

History
YRF was founded by Yash Raj Chopra, a veteran director and producer of the Indian film industry, in 1970. He started out as an assistant to his elder brother, B. R. Chopra, and went on to direct five films for his brother's banner, B.R. Films.

YRF Studios 
Upon realising the lack of a proper film shooting studio during their years of film-making, YRF went on build their dream film production studio in the year 2005, located in Mumbai city. The first film to be shot in YRF Studios was the company's 2006 critical and commercial blockbuster romantic thriller Fanaa. Some of the notable films of outside banners that were shot in the studio over the years are; Kabhi Alvida Naa Kehna (2006), Partner (2007), Taare Zameen Par (2007), Dostana (2008), Wanted (2009), 3 Idiots (2009), Dabangg (2010), Bodyguard (2011), Ra.One (2011), Agneepath (2012), Chennai Express (2013), Jai Ho (2014) and PK (2014). The studio was created and designed by Chopra and his then-wife, Payal Khanna and is equipped with high technology film shooting equipment and materials.

YRF Home Entertainment 
Apart from film production, Chopra's YRF also distributed (theatrical, home entertainment and satellite) and canvassed a wide variety of independent films that came out of the Parallel Cinema industry of India, such as Godmother (1999), Zubeidaa (2001), Maqbool (2004), Meenaxi: A Tale of Three Cities (2004), My Brother Nikhil (2005), Mangal Pandey: The Rising (2005) and Maine Gandhi Ko Nahin Mara (2005), that helped them leverage with a powerful film production house such as his, and thereby reach a wider audience on their release. YRF Distributors also released several big-budgeted films such as Kuch Kuch Hota Hai (1998), Kaho Naa... Pyaar Hai (2000), Kabhi Khushi Kabhie Gham... (2001), Koi... Mil Gaya (2003), Kal Ho Naa Ho (2003), Black (2005), Krrish (2006) and Kabhi Alvida Naa Kehna (2006).

YRF Music 
After constantly delivering musical successes such as Darr, Dilwale Dulhaniya Le Jayenge and Dil To Pagal Hai throughout the years of its existence, the company decided to leverage their growing clout in the music industry. YRF established their independent feature music distribution leg under the name YRF Music in 2004. The leg was developed for the purpose of digital as well as physical distribution of all the film soundtracks released under the banner. The first soundtrack to be distributed under YRF Music was the company's critical and commercial blockbuster epic love saga Veer-Zaara. The leg established careers of many budding music composers throughout the years, who leveraged themselves by scoring music for YRF projects such as Jatin–Lalit (Dilwale Dulhania Le Jayenge), Shankar–Ehsaan–Loy (Bunty Aur Babli), Pritam (Dhoom), Vishal–Shekhar (Salaam Namaste), Salim–Sulaiman (Rab Ne Bana Di Jodi), Amit Trivedi (Ishaqzaade), Ram Sampath (Luv Ka The End), Sajid–Wajid (Daawat-e-Ishq), Sohail Sen (Mere Brother Ki Dulhan), Raghu Dixit (Mujhse Fraaandship Karoge), Sachin–Jigar (Shuddh Desi Romance) and Amartya Rahut (Aurangzeb).

Walt Disney buyout-refusal 
The Walt Disney Company entered Indian Entertainment in 2007 through a three-film co-production agreement (Ta Ra Rum Pum, Thoda Pyaar Thoda Magic and Roadside Romeo) with YRF. Disney's move was seen as a bid to increase its global clout and finally enter the increasingly lucrative Indian Cinema arena. YRF however declined the acquisition offer made by the American conglomerate.

The two companies together established Disney UTV, that functioned as the Indian subsidiary of the American company. In December 2016, Disney announced that is restructuring its Indian operations and UTV will no longer produce movies and will focus only on distribution of its Hollywood films.

Aditya Chopra as Vice-Chairman 
The company saw an all-time low, with several of their high-budgeted films not doing well at the box office, despite favourable critical reviews and the company thereby suffering losses amounting to millions from 2007 to 2010. The films broke YRF's perfect success ratio and were oddly released one after another. Some of the most unsuccessful films produced under the banner were Jhoom Barabar Jhoom, Laaga Chunari Mein Daag, Aaja Nachle, Tashan, Thoda Pyaar Thoda Magic and Roadside Romeo, Dil Bole Hadippa!, Rocket Singh: Salesman of the Year and Pyaar Impossible.

Aditya Chopra then took over as the Vice-Chairman of Yash Raj Films in 2010, soon after the release of the film Badmaash Company under the same banner.

2011 landmark deal 
In 2011, the company took the critical decision of banking on the successes of 3 Idiots (2009), Ra.One (2011) and Bodyguard (2011) and went into production of three individual mainstream films with Aamir Khan for Dhoom 3, Shahrukh Khan for Jab Tak Hai Jaan and with Salman Khan for Ek Tha Tiger, the first installment in the YRF Spy Universe. The move was seen as a landmark deal by YRF as it engaged three of the most commercially successful actors of Indian Cinema in independent projects at the time.

All three of these films broke box office records of India and went on to become some of the highest-grossing films of their time. Jab Tak Hai Jaan opened worldwide on the Diwali day of 2012 and went on to earn  and became the fifteenth highest-grossing film in India.

Aditya Chopra as Chairman 
After the demise of Yash Chopra in October 2012, Aditya Chopra was elevated to the position of chairman and Chief Executive of the company's studio wing. Facing overwhelming pressure by the Indian bourses to be publicly listed around the same period, the company went for a soft-launch on 3 January 2013.

The company received angel investment by institutional fund-raisers such as LIC of India, RNT Associates, PremjiInvest, Catamaran Ventures, Maruti Udyog and Unilazer Ventures. YRF was made open to Indian enterprises only and no FDI was accepted. Venture capitalists also showed interest with Adi Godrej, Y. C. Deveshwar, Kumar Birla, Arundhati Bhattacharya, Anand Mahindra, Chanda Kochhar, Sunil Mittal, Shikha Sharma and Uday Kotak investing undisclosed sums. YRF came out with more films, under the chairmanship of Chopra and the new management.

Work with newcomers
YRF launched a number of budding screenwriters and directors under their banner throughout these years. Directors and screenwriters such as Karan Johar (his Kuch Kuch Hota Hai was co-produced and released by Yash Raj Film Distributors), Kunal Kohli, Kabir Khan, Sanjay Gadhvi, Jaideep Sahni, Siddharth Anand, Shimit Amin, Habib Faisal, Shaad Ali, Maneesh Sharma and Vijay Acharya debuted under YRF and have gone on to become independent entities in films. The company also produced films for filmmakers such as Anil Mehta and Pradeep Sarkar under their banner. The company was eventually ranked #1 (among the most successful film production companies in India) in a survey conducted by Filmfare and Number 27 (among the most successful film production companies in the world) in a survey by The Hollywood Reporter.

Talent Management 
Apart from producing big-budgeted films with established actors, YRF also announced several films featuring relative newcomers in the fourth quarter of Fiscal year 2012; Aurangzeb starring Prithviraj Sukumaran, Sashaa Agha and Arjun Kapoor, Gunday starring Ranveer Singh, Bewakoofiyaan starring Ayushmann Khurrana and Sonam Kapoor, Daawat-e-Ishq with Aditya Roy Kapur, Mardaani with Rani Mukerji, and Kill Dil starring Ali Zafar and Govinda. The films released all through 2013 and 2014 were seen as a strategic move by the company to infuse newer talent into Indian Cinema in the form of actors, screenwriters, directors and technicians. In a bid to break away from the traditional star system of Indian cinema, the company ventured into producing low-budgeted independent films with new talent (actors, creatives and technicians) from 2008. Apart from working with upcoming actors, the company independently launched several new faces as leading actors in several of their big-budgeted films through their home banner and through Y-Films, including:

Offices 
YRF is headquartered in Mumbai. In India, YRF has a network of distribution offices in Mumbai, Delhi, Jalandhar, Jaipur, Amravati, Indore, Bengaluru, Hyderabad, Kolkata, Chennai and Kochi. Internationally, there are offices in the United Kingdom, the United States of America, and the United Arab Emirates.

Tie-ups 
Throughout the years of its existence, YRF inked various strategic business agreements with independent film and media entities present in the country.

Produced and distributed films

References

External links 
 

 
Hindi cinema
Film production companies based in Mumbai
Indian companies established in 1970
Producers who won the Best Popular Film Providing Wholesome Entertainment National Film Award